Nagalaphu is a Himalayan mountain peak located in the Pithoragarh district of Uttarakhand state in India.

History 
It is the part of Himalayan mountain massif that divides Lassar-Darma valley and Ralam-Gori Ganga valley.

South of the peak are the five peaks of Panchachuli. Sona and Meola glaciers (that together form the Panchchuli Glacier) are to the east of Nagalaphu. To the peak's west is the large Uttari Balati glacier.

Nagalaphu has yet to be scaled.

References

Mountains of Uttarakhand
Geography of Pithoragarh district